Rebecca Lynne Malamud, also known as Rebecca Pranger, Rebecca Fowler, and Rebecca Hargrave, is an American photographer and website designer. She creates new work at her Point B Studio in Port Orford, Oregon.

She attended Nashville State Technical Institute and Florida School of the Arts in the 1980s. In 1993, she co-founded her own design and web development firm called enviro|media. In 1996, she designed the website Internet 1996 World Exposition with her husband Carl Malamud, working remotely from her office in Cincinnati, Ohio, with a team of artists, writers, programmers and photographers around the globe. In 1998, she was creative director of Invisible Worlds, where she received four NewMedia INVISION awards. In 2000, she joined the Internet Multicasting Service. In 2006, she founded the Rural Design Collective.

References

External links
 
 Point B Studio, Port Orford

Web designers
Photographers from Oregon
American women photographers
Living people
Year of birth missing (living people)
Place of birth missing (living people)
People from Curry County, Oregon
Women graphic designers
Port Orford, Oregon
21st-century American women